Of Life and Love is a 1954 Italian comedy film directed by Aldo Fabrizi, Giorgio Pastina, Mario Soldati and Luigi Zampa.

Plot
The film tells four episodes from stories written by Luigi Pirandello (from the work: Novelle per un anno).

The jar
A landowner ignorant and arrogant he is afraid that his big jar is broken because of a storm that is coming and he entrusts it to one of its employees silly that the rocks. The owner angrily dismisses the man and called Zi 'Dima, the master repairman to fix the jar, but they get stuck in there.

Ventaglino
A woman spends all his possessions for a fan and starts to play the role of a prostitute.

The license
Rosario chiarchiaro she won the enmity of his countrymen because he wants to settle the "license Evil Eye" so that his family can live in more favorable conditions. To do this, disguises herself as a true bearer of bad luck (think that Toto had a great fear for jettatori) finally getting his job

Tight Formal Wear
The portly professor Fabio Gori (Fabrizi) is invited to the wedding of one of his former students, for which he borrows a set of formal wear, which is hopelessly too small for him, but which he insists on wearing. Arriving at her house, he discovers that the bride's mother has died from the excitement of seeing her daughter wed. The groom's rich and arrogant family are opposed to the marriage and try to take advantage of the situation to postpone the wedding indefinitely. Gori knows that the groom is a good man and that he would make his ex-student happy. Knowing that if he doesn't act, the relatives will be able to divide the couple definitively, he insists that the matrimony go ahead despite the misfortune. In the end he confesses that he found the strength to react to the hypocritical protests of the groom's relatives because of his irritability due to wearing such a tight garment.

The film is presented by actor and voice actor Emilio Cigoli, located in dubbing room, he explains the meaning of the four episodes.

Cast 
 Turi Pandolfini:  Zi' Dima (segment "La giara")
 Antonio Nicotra:  Don Lolò Zirafa (segment "La giara")
 Domenico Modugno: Tamantino (segment "La giara")
 Franca Gandolfi:  Daughter (segment "La giara")
 Myriam Bru: Tuta (segment "Il ventaglio")
 Pina Piovani:  Daughter  (segment "Il ventaglio")
 Totò:  Rosario Chiarchiaro (segment "La patente")
 Armenia Balducci: Rosinella Chiarchiaro (segment "La patente")
 Mario Castellani: Judge (segment "La patente") 
 Anita Durante: Wife (segment "La patente")
 Virna Lisi:  Daughter  (segment "La patente")
 Aldo Fabrizi:  Professor Fabio Gori (segment "Marsina stretta")
 Lucia Bosè:  Angela Reis (segment "Marsina stretta")
 Walter Chiari:  Andrea Migri (segment "Marsina stretta")
 Zoe Incrocci:  Andrea's sister (segment "Marsina stretta")

References

External links

1954 films
1954 comedy films
1950s Italian-language films
Italian black-and-white films
Films based on works by Luigi Pirandello
Films directed by Luigi Zampa
Films directed by Mario Soldati
Films directed by Aldo Fabrizi
Films directed by Giorgio Pastina
Films set in Sicily
Films set in Rome
Films shot in Rome
Italian anthology films
Italian comedy films
1950s Italian films